The Medicare Improvements for Patients and Providers Act of 2008 ("MIPPA"), is a 2008 statute of United States Federal legislation which amends the Social Security Act.

On July 15, 2008, President George W. Bush vetoed the bill. On that same day the House of Representatives and the Senate voted to overturn the veto.

This law contained the first revision to policy covering Medicare Part D.

References

External links

text at Thomas 

Acts of the 110th United States Congress
United States federal health legislation